Trond Strande (born 24 November 1970) is a Norwegian football coach and former footballer who is currently assistant coach in Eliteserien club Molde. He spent his entire career playing for Molde FK and was a regular on Molde's team from 1991 to 2007.

Club career
Strande was born in Molde, and grew up in Elnesvågen. As a youngster, Strande started to play football for Elnesvågen IL, and made his debut for the first-team at the age of 15. In 1987, he played for Fræna FK, where he was a regular on both the youth-team and the first-team. Strande joined the youth-team of Molde FK the next season.

Trond Strande was taken up in Molde's senior squad in 1990, and he made his debut on 28 April 1991 against Lyn, when he came on as a substitute in the 86th minute. This match was the opening match of the 1991 season, and also the match Morten Bakke made his debut for Molde.

The highlights of his career is the two cup championships in 1994 and 2005, and Molde's participation in the Champions League in 1999, from which he is remembered for several eminent dribble raid up the right side. Strande is also well remembered for his stoppage-time equalizing free-kick goal against local rivals Aalesund on 18 October 2003.

In December 2005, Strande stated that he was ready to take over as Molde's head coach after Bo Johansson, if the club management asked for it. But Molde appointed Arild Stavrum as new coach before the 2006 season and Strande continued as a player until he retired after helping Molde gain promotion to Tippeligaen in the 2007 season.

Trond Strande played a total of 238 matches in Tippeligaen, and 520 matches in total. Alongside Vegard Forren and Mattias Moström, he is the only player to have appearances for Molde in 12 consecutive top division seasons.

Coaching career
After his retirement, he has worked at Akerakademiet (Molde FK's youth academy) and been coach for Molde's U17-team.

In 2015, he became assistant coach for Molde's first team.

Career statistics

Honours
Norwegian Cup: 1994, 2005
1. divisjon: 2007

See also
List of one-club men

References

1970 births
Living people
People from Molde
People from Fræna
Norwegian footballers
Molde FK players
Eliteserien players
Norwegian First Division players
Molde FK non-playing staff
Association football defenders
Sportspeople from Møre og Romsdal